Shoreline Conference is one of the many athletic conferences in Connecticut. The conference consists mostly of schools in Middlesex County and serves one school in New Haven County and another in New London County. It is a member of the CIAC.

List of member high schools

Sports

Fall

Volleyball 
Field Hockey
Soccer
Cross Country
Swimming (girls)
(There is no shoreline league for football)

Winter

Swimming (boys)
Basketball
Cheerleading
Indoor Track
Gymnastics
Wrestling

Spring

Lacrosse
Tennis
Baseball
Softball
Outdoor Track and Field
Golf

Education in Connecticut
High school sports conferences and leagues in the United States
Sports in Connecticut